Lynn Gumert (born 1961) is an American musician and contemporary composer.

Biography
Gumert studied at Indiana University, Bloomington, with Claude Baker, Eugene O'Brien, and Donald Freund, graduating with Masters of Music and Doctorate of Music degrees. She also studied with Ellen Taafe Zwilich and Shulamit Ran, recorder with Eva Legene, Emily Samuels and Scott Reiss, and voice with Camilla Williams and Sudie Marcuse-Blatz.

After completing her education, Gumert took a position teaching Women's and Gender Studies at Rutgers University. She is artistic director of Zorzal Music Ensemble which performs Spanish and Latin American music from 12th-century to contemporary. She is currently pursuing a masters in music therapy at Montclair State University, where she received the Ott award for outstanding music therapy intern. She has one daughter, Clara.

Works
Selected works include:
Díestas aves
Roundabout, for flute, percussion, 2 trombones, and double bass 
Milkweed, for solo voice
Mary's Lullaby
Quemar las naves, scored for voices, recorders, strings and percussion

References

1961 births
Living people
20th-century classical composers
American music educators
American women classical composers
American classical composers
Indiana University alumni
Rutgers University faculty
20th-century American women musicians
20th-century American composers
Women music educators
20th-century women composers
American women academics
21st-century American women